The early Kassite rulers are the sequence of eight, or possibly nine, names which appear on the Babylonian and Assyrian King Lists purporting to represent the first or ancestral monarchs of the dynasty that was to become the Kassite or 3rd Dynasty of Babylon which governed for 576 years, 9 months, 36 kings, according to the King List A. In all probability the dynasty ruled Babylon for around 350 years.

The King list tradition

The era of the early Kassite rulers is characterized by a dearth of surviving historical records. The principal sources of evidence for the existence of these monarchs are the Babylonian King List A, which shows just the first six, and the Assyrian Synchronistic King List, which gives their names indistinctly, and are compared below, after Brinkman.

The tenth position of the Synchronistic King List is occupied by Burna-Buriyåš I.

History

Possibly the earliest military action involving the Kassites is preserved in the date formula for Samsu-iluna's ninth year (1741 BC). It is called "the year of the Kassite army", in which it seems that he was not wholly successful at repelling the raiders, a sign of weakness which triggered widespread revolts in cities all over Mesopotamia and a decisive response from Samsu-iluna. The fourth year-name of Abi-Ešuh (1707 BC), the son and successor of Samsu-iluna, records that Abi-Ešuh "subdued the Kassites". Around the same time a king of the middle Euphrates kingdom called Ḫana, successor state of Mari, bore the name Kaštiliašu, but apart from this name there is no evidence that the region was occupied by Kassites during this time, and he was succeeded by Šunuhru-Ammu, whose name is Amorite. Two seal impressions found at Ḫana's capital Terqa read, "[Gi]mil Ninkar[ak], son of Arši-a[ḫum], [se]rvant of Ila[ba], [and K]aštili[ašu]". Frayne speculates that Kaštiliašu may have been a Babylonian installed by Samsu-iluna after his defeat of Iadiḫ-abu and not a native ruler.

A first-millennium BC school text purporting to be a copy of one of his inscriptions credits Gandaš with the conquest of Bà-bà-lam. This reads:

Agum I may be the subject of a 7th-century BC historical inscription which also mentions Damiq-ilῑšu, the last king of the 1st Dynasty of Isin. The Agum-Kakrime Inscription names Agum ra-bi-i, Kaštiliašu, Abi-Rattaš, and Ur-šigurumaš as ancestors of Agum-Kakrime (Agum II), each son of the preceding except Ur-šigurumaš, who is described as descendant of Abi-Rattaš. The traces in the ninth position of the Synchronistic King List do not allow for the name Agum, so Kakrime has been suggested as an alternative.

The Tell Muḥammed texts

Excavations in the southeastern suburb of Baghdad known as Tell Muḥammed yielded two archives of the first Sealand Dynasty period. Those from level 3, excavated in the 1990s, were dated with year names, for example: "Year water carried King Ḫurduzum up to the city". Those from level 2, excavated in the 1970s, possessed a slightly different date formula, for example: "Year 38 Babylon was resettled. Year King Šipta'ulzi", and are mostly silver and cereal loans. The layers are thought to be around a generation apart. The resettlement of Babylon has been linked to the aftermath of the Hittite sack of the city under Mursili I. Boese proposed the two kings be identified with those in positions seven and eight, and that a slightly different reading of Ḫurbazum for Ḫurduzum be adopted, a position disputed by Brinkman.

Inscriptions

Notes

References

Kassites
States and territories established in the 18th century BC
States and territories disestablished in the 16th century BC
Babylonian kings
Kassite kings